Seer is a 2011 Chinese animated fantasy adventure film based on the online game of the same name. It is about some robots on an airship called Seer who were off to find a legendary phoenix in a vast universe, they also had to fight off some evil space pirates who were blocking their way. It was released on July 28, 2011.  The film is the first in a film series, being followed by Seer 2 (2012), Seer the Movie 3: Heroes Alliance (2013), Seer 4 (2014) and Seer Movie 5: Rise of Thunder (2015).

Reception

Box office
The film earned  at the Chinese box office.

References

External links

Chinese animated fantasy films
2011 animated films
2011 films
Animated films based on video games
Animated adventure films
2010s fantasy adventure films
Chinese fantasy adventure films